Kanasina Rani is a 1992 Indian Kannada language film directed by M. S. Rajashekar and produced by M. Sunanda and M. Krishna under the banner Sri Lakshmi Productions. The film stars Malashri, Shashikumar and Jaggesh. The supporting cast features Thriveni, K. S. Ashwath, Thoogudeepa Srinivas, Girija Lokesh, Tennis Krishna and Vajramuni.

The film was success and the title of the film stuck as a prefix to the lead actress, who was henceforth referred to, sometimes as Kanasina Rani Malashri.

Cast 
 Malashri
 Shashikumar
 Jaggesh
 Thriveni
 K. S. Ashwath
 Vajramuni
 Thoogudeepa Srinivas
 Girija Lokesh
 Tennis Krishna

Soundtrack

Upendra Kumar composed the music for the film and the soundtracks. The album consists of five soundtracks.

References

External links 

1992 films
1990s Kannada-language films
Films directed by M. S. Rajashekar
Films scored by Upendra Kumar